Gallery Arcturus is an art gallery and museum in downtown Toronto, Ontario, Canada. It is located near Toronto Metropolitan University and Church and Wellesley in the Garden District neighbourhood, on Gerrard Street East. The gallery is a member of the Ontario Association of Art Galleries and the Ontario Museum Association.

The museum operates as a public, not-for-profit contemporary art gallery with a permanent art collection of over 200 works including drawings, paintings, collages, photographs and sculptures made by notable North American artists including the photographer Simeon Posen, the Inuit art sculptor Floyd Kuptana, and the renowned artist, teacher, writer, and founder of the School of Reductionism, E.J. Gold. Established in 1994, Gallery Arcturus has held many notable public exhibitions including Thomas Henrickson "Inner Mirror", E.J. Gold "Large As Life", Peter Banks "Emergence", Carol George "Asia Calling", Deborah Harris "Toward the One", and Dominique Cruchet & Joan Cullen "Crossing the Great Waters". The artist-in-residence and curator of the gallery is Deborah Harris.

History
Gallery Arcturus was established in 1994 by the Foundation for the Study of Objective Art, a Canadian federally registered charitable organization, to provide members of the public with an opportunity to view and study works by contemporary North American artists free of charge and without commercial motives. The gallery was first located in rented space on Parliament Street in Toronto. The gallery began acquiring an extensive permanent art collection for display and study, starting with a significant purchase of works by members of the School of Reductionism in Grass Valley, California, including paintings by E.J. Gold, Della Haywood, Heather Valencia, Robert Trice and Kelly Rivera.

In 1997, the Foundation for the Study of Objective Art purchased a 10,000 square foot heritage building located at 80 Gerrard Street East in downtown Toronto and renovated it to serve as the permanent location for the gallery and its administrative offices. The Gallery Arcturus building, in addition to being a historic property (built in 1858 in the Georgian Revival style), was immortalized by the famous Canadian Group of Seven artist Lawren Harris in a 1912 painting entitled Houses, Gerrard Street, Toronto (now part of the McMichael Canadian Art Collection).

The permanent art collection has grown every year and totals over 225 works of art. Pieces from the collection are often displayed as part of new exhibits or as distinct installations. Over the last two decades, shows have tended to change every six to eight weeks.

Exhibition spaces

Gallery Arcturus consists of five exhibit spaces: Genesis, Up North, Kuptana, Collage, and the Ascending Gallery. The Genesis Gallery is the space where artists are invited to create work in response to an inquiry initiated by artist-in-residence Deborah Harris. The Up North Gallery features landscape paintings and sculptures reflecting northern Canada. Sculpture and sketches that draw on the Inuit art tradition are displayed in the Floyd Kuptana Gallery which also includes artworks and books by E.J. Gold. The Collage Gallery adjoins this second-floor space with works by Deborah Harris and other artists currently working in collage. The Ascending Gallery, extending from the first to the fourth floor, features works by many of the gallery's collected artists including photographer Simeon Posen and multiple media artist Sae Kimura.

Permanent collection
The Gallery Arcturus permanent art collection includes the following artists:
Dara Aram, Gisele Boulianne, William Caldwell, Peter Chung, Ed Cramer, Dominique Cruchet, Joan Cullen, Carol Currie and Stuart Leggett, Chris Dolan, Marie Fournier, Neil Fox, Camie Geary-Martin, Luke Gilliam, E.J. Gold, Jeremy Gordaneer, Christopher Griffin, Scott Griffin, Marni Grossman, Deborah Harris, Michael Hayes, Della Heywood, Lenka Holubec, Randy Hryhorczuk, Louis Irkok Jr, Olena Kassian, Floyd Kuptana, Dongmin Lai, Grabriel Lalonde, Chris Langstroth, Elaine Ling, Yousha Liu, Ruth Luginbuehl, Jorge Luna, Andrea Maguire, Larry Middlestadt, Sharon Naidos, Joachim Oepkes, Simeon Posen, Terri Quinn, Kelly Rivera, Wendy Rombough, Paul Saari, R.C. Trice, Heather Valencia, Susan Valyi, Francine Vernac, Irena Vormittag, Pamela Williams.

See also
List of art museums
List of museums in Toronto

References

1994 establishments in Ontario
Art museums established in 1994
Art museums and galleries in Ontario
Museums in Toronto
Contemporary art galleries in Canada